Annie LeBlanc (born 29 April 1992) is a Canadian middle-distance runner. She competed in the women's 800 metres at the 2017 World Championships in Athletics.

References

External links
 
 

1992 births
Living people
Canadian female middle-distance runners
World Athletics Championships athletes for Canada
People from Repentigny, Quebec
Sportspeople from Quebec